CDC Melbourne is a bus operator in Melbourne, Victoria, Australia. It operates 55 bus routes under contract to Public Transport Victoria. It is a subsidiary of ComfortDelGro Australia.

As at 2018, CDC Melbourne was the third-largest commuter bus operator in Melbourne, with 16% of the market share in the city.

History

In February 2009, ComfortDelGro Cabcharge acquired Kefford Corporation including the Eastrans and Westrans operations in eastern and western Melbourne respectively. At the time of its acquisition by CDC in 2009, Kefford was the fourth-largest bus operator in Victoria with a 16% market share, and with a fleet of 328 buses and six depots. The Eastrans and Westrans brands were retained following the acquisition.

In July 2011, Eastrans commenced route 601 as a high frequency shuttle between Huntingdale station and Monash University. In July 2013, CDC acquired the route operations of Driver Group with five routes (routes 612 and 623 - 626) and 42 buses, and integrated into the Eastrans brand. In October 2014, Eastrans and Westrans were combined and rebranded as CDC Melbourne.

In December 2017, the Wyndham depot was opened in the suburb of Truganina, replacing the Altona and Werribee depots which were subsequently closed. The head office of CDC Victoria and the Operations and Customer Centre (OCC) were also moved from Altona and Sunshine respectively into the new depot.

In May 2018, Tullamarine Bus Lines was acquired by ComfortDelGro Australia with 34 buses. It was rebranded CDC Tullamarine and integrated into CDC Melbourne on 17 August 2018.

CDC Melbourne initially signed a ten-year performance-based contract with the Victorian government in April 2018, due to commence on 1 July 2018. However, in June 2018, the government offered a seven-year contract to all Melbourne bus operators, with no end-of-term access to staff, depots, fleet and intellectual property. This meant that under this contract, operators are not obliged to transfer any of their assets to the government. CDC Melbourne (including Tullamarine Bus Lines) successfully negotiated with the government and secured a seven-year contracts for its Melbourne metropolitan bus services, which commenced on 1 August 2018.

Depots
CDC Melbourne operates from four depots, whose names may differ from the suburbs they are located in:
Oakleigh - located in Oakleigh South
Sunshine - located in Albion
Tullamarine - located in Airport West
Wyndham - located in Truganina, also houses the head office of CDC Victoria

CDC Melbourne also used to operate from Altona and Werribee depots until they moved into the Wyndham depot which opened in December 2017.

Fleet
As of June 2022, the fleet comprised 377 buses and coaches.

Liveries
Westrans fleet livery was white with red stripes for buses at Altona (now closed) and Sunshine depots, and white with blue stripes at the Werribee depot (now closed). Eastrans fleet livery was white with white and green stripes. The Public Transport Victoria white and orange livery has been adopted as standard for route service buses and an orange, blue and white livery was adopted for charter buses. However some older buses still retained the old Westrans livery with CDC Melbourne signage.

References

External links

CDC Victoria website
Showbus gallery Eastrans
Showbus gallery Westrans

Bus companies of Victoria (Australia)
Bus transport in Melbourne
ComfortDelGro companies